The 1979–80 Biathlon World Cup was a multi-race tournament over a season of biathlon, organised by the UIPMB (Union Internationale de Pentathlon Moderne et Biathlon). The season started on 18 January 1980 in Ruhpolding, West Germany, and ended on 30 March 1980 in Murmansk, Soviet Union. It was the third season of the Biathlon World Cup, and it was only held for men.

Calendar
Below is the World Cup calendar for the 1979–80 season.

 1980 Winter Olympics races were not included in the 1979–80 World Cup scoring system.

*The relays were technically unofficial races as they did not count towards anything in the World Cup.

World Cup Podium

Men

Standings: Men

Overall 

Final standings after 10 races.

Achievements
First World Cup career victory
, — the WC 3 Individual in Lahti; it also was his first podium
, 25, in his 3rd season — the WC 5 Sprint in Murmansk; first podium was 1977–78 Individual in Ruhpolding

First World Cup podium
, 19, in his 1st season — no. 3 in the WC 1 Individual in Ruhpolding
, 23, in his 3rd season — no. 3 in the WC 1 Sprint in Ruhpolding; it also was the first podium for a French biathlete
, 26, in his 3rd season — no. 3 in the WC 2 Individual in Antholz-Anterselva
, 21, in his 2nd season — no. 2 in the WC 2 Sprint in Antholz-Anterselva
, 26, in his 3rd season — no. 3 in the WC 2 Sprint in Antholz-Anterselva
, 26, in his 3rd season — no. 3 in the WC 3 Individual in Lahti
, 20, in his 1st season — no. 2 in the WC 5 Individual in Murmansk; it also was the first podium for a Bulgarian biathlete

Victory in this World Cup (all-time number of victories in parentheses)
, 4 (8) first places
, 3 (8) first places
, 2 (2) first places
, 1 (1) first place

Retirements
Following notable biathletes retired after the 1979–80 season:

Notes 

1.  This team was a regional team from Finland called Suomussalmen Rasti.
2.  The Aftenposten source gives the French team a time of 1:59:58.

References

Biathlon World Cup
World Cup